Vladimír Kinier (born 6 April 1958) is a retired Slovak football defender who played for Czechoslovakia in the 1990 FIFA World Cup, in which he played one complete match. In total he earned 10 caps for Czechoslovakia.  He was born in Žilina and played most of his club career at Slovan Bratislava.

References

External links

1958 births
Living people
Association football defenders
ŠK Slovan Bratislava players
MŠK Žilina players
Bourges 18 players
Ligue 2 players
Slovak footballers
Slovak expatriate footballers
Czechoslovak footballers
Czechoslovak expatriate footballers
Czechoslovak expatriate sportspeople in France
Slovak expatriate sportspeople in France
Expatriate footballers in France
1990 FIFA World Cup players
Czechoslovakia international footballers
Sportspeople from Žilina